The  took place at the New National Theater in Tokyo on December 30, 2012. The ceremony was televised in Japan on TBS.

Presenters 
 Shin'ichirō Azumi (TBS commentator)
 Yui Aragaki (actress)
 Erina Masuda (TBS commentator)
 Akiyo Yoshida (TBS commentator)

 Radio
 Kengo Komada (TBS commentator)

Winners and winning works

Grand Prix 
 AKB48 — "Manatsu no Sounds Good!"

Best Singer Award 
 Yoshimi Tendō

Best New Artist Award 
 Leo Ieiri

Best Album Award 
 Kana Nishino — Love Place

New Artist Award 
The artists who are awarded the New Artist Award are nominated for the Best New Artist Award.
 Leo Ieiri
 Misaki Usuzawa
 Erena Ono
 Tīna Karīna

Composer Award 
Raymond Matsuya - Dawn Blues (Singer: Hiroshi Itsuki)

Lyricist Award 
Yasushi Akimoto - UZA, Gingham Check, Manatsu no Sounds Good!, etc. (Singer: AKB48)

Arranger Award 
Yasutaka Nakata - Spice (Singer: Perfume), Tsukematsukeru (Singer: Kyary Pamyu Pamyu), etc.

References

External links 
 Official results page

2012
Japan Record Awards
Japan Record Awards
Japan Record Awards
Japan Record Awards